Yadanar My (born 17 August 1989) is a Burmese singer and actress of ethnic Rakhine descent. She is best known for her pop songs; such as "A Lwan Thint Pan Chi", "Good Night", "Thu Thi Say", "Pyaw Thar Pae", "Ma May Par Nae Yo Yo Lay" and "Lo Yar Thone".

Early life and education
Yadanar My was born on 17 August 1989 in Ley Taung town in Ramree, Rakhine State, Myanmar. She is the daughter of the once-successful singer Mai and inherited her artistic heritage. She attended at Basic Education High School No. 2 Latha and moved to Basic Education High School No. 1 Dagon.

Career
She entered the art world in 2006 with the song "Far Away" and celebrated City FM's 6th anniversary with her mother Mai. The song "Do Not Call" was well received by the audience.
She was released five albums and the songs; "A Lwan Thint Pan Chi", "Good Night", "Thu Thi Say", "Pyaw Thar Pae", "Ma May Par Nae Yo Yo Lay", "Lo Yar Thone" were the most popular among audience. Yadanar Mai inherited her mother's legacy and has been in the music business for a long time. Also on the field of film, she starred as the student Yadanar Mai in the film Future of The Starlets, directed by Kyi Phyu Shin. 
She also starred in Ar Yone Oo Mhar Phoo The Kyar and If I Can Hate, I Want to Hate film. Although more successful as a singer than an actor but the audience accepted both.

Discography

Album
Ma Shi Loh Ma Phyit
Pa Pha Ba Ba Ma
Good Night, Lover
Thu Thi Say
Pyaw Thar Pae
Who are you

Awards
Female Singer Award of Most Requested Song (Shwe FM 7th Anniversary)
Female Singer Award of Most Popular Requested Song (City FM 16th Anniversary)

References

External links
 

1989 births
Living people
People from Rakhine State
21st-century Burmese women singers